RC TEX-A-C is a Ukrainian rugby club in Kharkiv. They currently play in Group A of the Ukraine Rugby Superliga.

History
The club was founded in 2002.

External links
RC TEX-A-C

Rugby clubs established in 2002
Ukrainian rugby union teams
Sport in Kharkiv